Missulena faulderi is a species of mygalomorph spiders in the family Actinopodidae. It is found in Western Australia.

References

faulderi
Spiders described in 2013